The 2090–10 EHF Cup season, TBV Lemgo won the Europe's club handball tournament.

Knockout stage

Round 1

|}

Round 2

|}

Round 3

|}

Round of 16

|}

* Dunkerque HBGL vs GOG Svendborg TGI was cancelled.

Quarterfinals

|}

Semifinals

|}

Finals

|}

References

External links 
 EHF Cup website

EHF Cup seasons
Champions League
Champions League